Grace Chisholm Young (née Chisholm, 15 March 1868 – 29 March 1944) was an English mathematician.  She was educated at Girton College, Cambridge, England and continued her studies at Göttingen University in Germany, where in 1895 she received a doctorate. 
Her early writings were published under the name of her husband, William Henry Young, and they collaborated on mathematical work throughout their lives. For her work on calculus (1914–16), she was awarded the Gamble Prize for Mathematics by Girton College, University of Cambridge.

Early life
She was the youngest of three surviving children. Her father was a senior civil servant, with the title Warden of the Standards in charge of the Weights and Measures Department. The two girls were taught at home by their mother, father and a governess which was the custom for upper class family during that time. Her family encouraged her to become involved in social work, helping the poor in London. She had aspirations of studying medicine, but her family would not allow this. However, Chisholm wanted to continue her studies. She passed the senior examination for entrance into Cambridge University at the age of 17.

Education
Chisholm entered Girton College in 1889 aged 22, four years after she passed the senior entrance examination having been awarded the Sir Francis Goldsmid Scholarship by the college. At this time the college was only associated with the University of Cambridge with men and women graded on separate but related lists. Although she wanted to study medicine, her mother would not permit this, so, supported by her father, she decided to study mathematics. At the end of her first year, when the Mays list came out, she was top of the Second class immediately below Isabel Maddison. In 1893, Grace passed her final examinations with the equivalent of a first-class degree, ranked between 23 and 24 relative to 112 men.

She also took (unofficially, on a challenge, with Isabel Maddison) the exam for the Final Honours School in mathematics at the University of Oxford in 1892 in which she out-performed all the Oxford students. As a result, she became the first person to obtain a First class degree at both Oxford and Cambridge Universities in any subject (although they were not awarded formally).

Chisholm remained at Cambridge for an additional year to complete Part II of the Mathematical Tripos, in the hope of being able to follow an academic career.

She wanted to continue her studies and since women were not yet admitted to graduate schools in England she went to the University of Göttingen in Germany to study with Felix Klein. This was one of the major mathematical centres in the world. She had fortunately already learnt the German language. The decision to admit her had to be approved by the Berlin Ministry of Culture and was part of an experiment in admitting women to university studies. In 1895, at the age of 27, Chisholm was awarded a doctorate in mathematics. Again government approval had to be obtained to allow her to take the examination, which consisted of probing questions by several professors on sections such as geometry, differential equations, physics, astronomy, and the area of her dissertation, all in German. Along with her test she was required to take courses showing broader knowledge as well as prepare a thesis which was entitled Algebraisch-gruppentheoretische Untersuchungen zur sphärischen Trigonometrie (Algebraic Groups of Spherical Trigonometry).

Research
After returning to England in 1896 to marry, she resumed research she had initiated at Gӧttingen into an equation to determine the orbit of a comet. Her husband continued his work coaching in mathematics. However, in 1897 they both returned to Gӧttingen, encouraged by Felix Klein. Both attended advanced lectures and while she continued her mathematical research her husband started to work creatively for the first time. They visited Turin in Italy to study modern geometry and under Klein's guidance they began to work in the new area of set theory. From about 1901, the Youngs began to publish papers together. These concerned the theory of functions of a real variable and were heavily influenced by new ideas with which she had come into contact with in Gӧttingen.  In 1908 they moved to Geneva in Switzerland where she continued to be based while her husband held a series of academic posts in India and the UK. 
 
Although most of their work was published jointly it is believed that Grace did a large amount of the actual writing, and she also produced some independent work which, according to expert opinion, was deeper and more important than her husband's. In total, they published about 214 papers together, along with four books. She began to publish in her own name in 1914, and was awarded the Gamble Prize for Mathematics by Girton College for an essay On infinite derivates in 1915. This work was stimulated by developments in microscopy that allowed real molecular motion to be viewed. Her work between 1914–16 on relationships between derivatives of an arbitrary function contributed to the Denjoy-Young-Saks theorem.

They also wrote an elementary geometry book (The First Book of Geometry, 1905) which was translated into 4 languages. In 1906 the Youngs published The Theory of Sets of Points, the first textbook on set theory.

Personal life
Chisholm married William Henry Young in 1896, the year after she received her PhD from Göttingen. He had been her tutor for one term at Cambridge and they had become friends after he was one of the people that she sent a copy of her doctoral thesis.  He suggested collaboration in a publication about astronomy but they did not pursue this. They had six children within nine years.

In addition to her career as a pioneering woman in what was then a discipline with significant barriers to entry, she completed all the requirements for a medical degree except the internship. She also learned six languages and taught each of her children a musical instrument. In addition, she published two books for children (Bimbo: A Little Real Story for Jill and Molly (1905) and Bimbo and the Frogs: Another Real Story (1907)). The former was aimed to explain where babies came from to children while the latter was about cells. The Young's elementary geometry book (The First Book of Geometry, 1905) was inspired by the education of their son. In 1929 she started a historical novel The Crown of England set in the sixteenth century. She worked on this for five years but it was never published.

With the approach of World War II, she left Switzerland in 1940 to take two of her grandchildren to England. She planned to return immediately, but because of the fall of France, she could not. This left William alone, and he died two years later in 1942. Two years after that, Grace Young died of a heart attack.

Of their six children, three continued on to study mathematics (including Laurence Chisholm Young and Cecilia Rosalind Tanner), one daughter (Janet) became a physician, and one son (Patrick) became a chemist and pursued a career in finance and business. Their eldest son (Frank) was killed in World War I, when his plane was shot down in 1917, and his death had a profound effect on his parents, reducing their mathematical creativity. One of Grace's fourteen grandchildren, Sylvia Wiegand (daughter of Laurence), is a mathematician at the University of Nebraska and is a past president of the Association for Women in Mathematics.

Legacy
In 1996 Sylvia Wiegand and her husband Roger established a fellowship for graduate student research at the University of Nebraska in honor of Grace Chisholm Young and William Henry Young, called the Grace Chisholm Young and William Henry Young Award. Sylvia is one of Grace's fourteen grandchildren.

See also
Denjoy–Young–Saks theorem

References

External links
 
"Grace Chisholm Young", Biographies of Women Mathematicians, Agnes Scott College
University of Liverpool: Papers of Professor William Henry Young and Grace Chisholm Young

Alumni of Girton College, Cambridge
19th-century English mathematicians
20th-century English mathematicians
British women mathematicians
1868 births
1944 deaths
20th-century women mathematicians